RHWL Architects (originally Renton Howard Wood Levin Architects) was a British architecture practice based in London, Berlin and Qatar. It was established by Andrew Renton, Peter Howard, Humphrey Wood and Gerald Levin following the establishment of Andrew Renton & Associates in 1961. It was well known for projects undertaken by its Arts Team division. RHWL Architects, Arts Team and RHWL Interiors were part of Renton Howard Wood Levin LLP, a limited liability partnership. RHWL and Arts Team were acquired by Aedas on 26 January 2015.

Notable buildings
In order of opening date:

Arts & culture
 Crucible Theatre, Sheffield, 1971 
 Nottingham Royal Concert Hall, 1982
 Derngate Theatre, Northampton, 1983
 Old Vic Theatre, London, 1983
 Regent Theatre, Ipswich,1991
 Bridgewater Hall, Manchester, 1996
 Sadler's Wells Theatre, London, 1998
 Norden Farm Centre for the Arts, Maidenhead, 2000
 Coliseum Theatre restoration, London, 2004
 Aylesbury Waterside Theatre, 2010
 Bord Gais Energy Theatre, Grand Canal Square, Dublin, 2010
 Milton Court Concert Hall, City of London, 2013, Theatre and Studio Theatre for The Guildhall School of Music and Drama.

Hotels
 Tower Hotel, 1972
 St Pancras Chambers refurbishment and extension, London, 2011 (with Richard Griffiths Architects)

Awards and  commendations
15 RIBA, 14 Civic Trust, 3 RICS, 1 USITT, 1 Europa Nostra

 Europa Nostra Commendation London Coliseum

References

External links
Aedas RHWL website
Aedas Arts Team division website

Architecture firms based in London
Design companies established in 1961
1961 establishments in England
Design companies disestablished in 2015
2015 disestablishments in England
2015 mergers and acquisitions